The 2008–09 season in Hong Kong football, starting July 2008 and ending June 2009:

Overview

Events
On 9 July 2008, South China goalkeeper Zhang Chunhui was sentenced imprisonment for 8 months due to inflicting grievous bodily harm upon another person. He injured a 17-year-old boy in Causeway Bay on 19 December 2007.

On 22 July 2008, HKFA confirmed the Hong Kong First Division League team list for 2008-09 season. 13 teams will compete in the top division, among which TSW Pegasus and Xiangxue Eisiti will enter using competing membership, and they will need to sponsor one local cup competition each. There are two team name changes: Lanwa Redbull renamed to be Sheffield United and Wofoo Tai Po renames to be NT Realty Wofoo Tai Po.

On 2 September 2008, the 2008–09 season of Hong Kong First Division League started at Hong Kong Stadium, with the match between South China and Citizen, with Citizen drawing South China 1–1.

On 17 September 2008, South China head coach Tsang Wai Chung left his post.

Representative team

Hong Kong Team
The home team is on the left column; the away team is on the right column.

Friendly matches

Guangdong-Hong Kong Cup

Hong Kong representative football team participated in 31st Guangdong-Hong Kong Cup.

Asian Cup qualifiers
Hong Kong is going to play in their Asian Cup 2011 qualifying campaign.

Hong Kong U-23

Hong Kong Macau Interport

Honours

Overall Top-scorers

First Division

Asian clubs competitions

AFC Cup 2008

Kitchee - Eliminated in group stage
South China - Eliminated in group stage

AFC Cup 2009

Eastern - Eliminated in group stage
South China - Quarter-finals

Hong Kong Top Footballers Awards
 Footballer of the Year:  Lee Wai Lim (NT Realty Wofoo Tai Po)
 Best Youth Footballer:  Au Yeung Yiu Chung (South China),  Li Hon Ho (NT Realty Wofoo Tai Po)
 Coach of the Year:  Leslie Santos (Convoy Sun Hei)
 Top Footballers:
 Wong Chin Hung (TSW Pegasus / South China)
 Li Haiqiang (South China)
 Lee Kin Wo (Eastern)
 Xu Deshuai (Citizen)
 Edgar Aldrighi Júnior (NT Realty Wofoo Tai Po)
 Lee Hong Lim (NT Realty Wofoo Tai Po / TSW Pegasus)
 Lee Wai Lim (NT Realty Wofoo Tai Po)
 Tales Schutz (South China)
 Itaparica (TSW Pegasus)
 Chan Siu Ki (South China)
 Giovane (Convoy Sun Hei)

Exhibition matches

ING Cup

 MVP award:  Urby Emanuelson

Lunar New Year Cup
See 2009 Lunar New Year Cup.

Transfer deals

References

External links